Robert Johnstone Vance (March 15, 1854 – June 15, 1902) was a U.S. Representative from Connecticut.

Born in New York City, Vance attended the common schools. He moved to New Britain, Connecticut, in 1870. He attended the high school. City clerk of New Britain from 1878 until his resignation in 1887, having been elected a Representative. He became editor and publisher of the New Britain Herald in 1881. He served as member of the State house of representatives in 1886.

Vance was elected as a Democrat to the Fiftieth Congress (March 4, 1887 – March 3, 1889). He was an unsuccessful candidate for reelection in 1888 to the Fifty-first Congress. He resumed his former business pursuits. Labor commissioner of Connecticut 1893–1895. He served as mayor of New Britain, Connecticut, in 1896 and 1897. He served as delegate to the State constitutional convention in 1902. He died in Montreat, North Carolina on June 15, 1902. He was interred in Fairview Cemetery, New Britain, Connecticut. He was the father of Robert C. Vance (1894-1959), Herald publisher from 1951 to 1959. There is an elementary school, Vance Village, named after him in New Britain, Connecticut.

References

1854 births
1902 deaths
Democratic Party members of the Connecticut House of Representatives
Mayors of places in Connecticut
Democratic Party members of the United States House of Representatives from Connecticut
19th-century American politicians
Mayors of New Britain, Connecticut